William Alexander Blaikie  (June 19, 1951 – September 24, 2022) was a Canadian politician. He served as a member of Parliament (MP) from 1979 to 2008, representing Elmwood—Transcona and its antecedent ridings in the House of Commons of Canada for the federal New Democratic Party. Following his retirement from federal politics, he was a member of the Legislative Assembly of Manitoba from 2009 until 2011, representing the Winnipeg division of Elmwood as a member of the New Democratic Party of Manitoba, and served as Minister of Conservation and Government House Leader.

Blaikie had the longest continuous parliamentary record in the 38th and 39th Canadian parliaments, and in this capacity served as the Dean of the House. He was a member of the King's Privy Council for Canada. Blaikie was the Deputy Speaker of the House of Commons of Canada from 2006 to 2008.

Prior to the 2011 Manitoba election, he announced that he was retiring from political life.

Early life and career
Blaikie was born to a working-class family in Winnipeg, Manitoba, on June 19, 1951. His father was employed by Canadian National for over forty years, at first as a machinist and later in management. Blaikie served in The Queen's Own Cameron Highlanders of Canada from 1967 to 1972, and was a labourer on and off with the Canadian National Railway from 1969 to 1974 while attending university. He was a member of the Young Progressive Conservatives in high school, and joined the NDP in 1971.

Blaikie earned a Bachelor of Arts degree in philosophy and religious studies from the University of Winnipeg (1973), and a Master of Divinity from Emmanuel College, Toronto School of Theology (1977). He was ordained as a minister in the United Church of Canada on June 4, 1978, and subsequently became a politician in the social gospel tradition of such figures as J.S. Woodsworth, Tommy Douglas and Stanley Knowles. From 1977 to 1979, he worked as the Minister/Director of North End Community Ministry, an inner-city outreach ministry of the United Church located within the historic Stella Ave. Mission in Winnipeg.

Federal parliamentarian
The New Democratic Party has never formed the national government in Canada, and Blaikie served in Ottawa for 29 years as an opposition MP. He held many important critic portfolios, and was respected by members of all parties for his personal integrity and conviction.

Clark, Trudeau and Turner governments (1979–84)
Blaikie was first elected to the House of Commons of Canada in the 1979 federal election, defeating incumbent Progressive Conservative MP Dean Whiteway (who had previously been elected in the riding of Selkirk, which was eliminated by redistribution). The Progressive Conservatives won a minority government under the leadership of Joe Clark, but lost a parliamentary motion of non-confidence later in the year. A new election was held in early 1980, in which the Liberal Party won a majority government under the leadership of Pierre Trudeau. Blaikie was comfortably re-elected in his own riding.

Blaikie was appointed the NDP's Social Policy Critic in 1979, and was promoted to Health Critic in 1980. He was instrumental in forcing Minister of Health, Monique Bégin, to enact the Canada Health Act in 1984, to deal with the crisis in medicare due to user fees and physicians' extra-billing. In her memoirs, Bégin wrote that Blaikie waged "guerilla warfare" in the House of Commons over the issue. He also served as caucus chair in 1983–84.

Mulroney and Campbell governments (1984–93)
The Progressive Conservatives won a landslide majority government in the 1984 federal election under Brian Mulroney, defeating the Liberals under their new leader John Turner. Blaikie was again returned for his riding, and was appointed NDP Environment Critic in the new parliament. He opposed the Mulroney government's budget cuts and was strongly critical of Environment Minister, Suzanne Blais-Grenier, saying, "It is clear she does not think about the environment. She thinks about the deficit." He called for Blais-Grenier's resignation in June 1985, after she remarked that national parks could be opened to mining and logging. In the same year, Blaikie brought forward a private member's bill calling for a three-year moratorium on the construction and export of nuclear power stations, to be followed by a national referendum on any further development.

Blaikie spoke against a bill that proposed the return of capital punishment in 1987, saying that its passage would mark "a step toward not a less violent society, but a more violent society". The bill was defeated in a free vote. He was also an opponent of Sunday shopping law reform in this period, arguing that it interfered with a community's right to determine common rest times.

He was promoted to External Affairs Critic in September 1987. One of his first major policy statements in this portfolio was to call for Canada to stop allowing American cruise missile tests over its territory. He was also critical of Canada's proposed Free Trade Agreement with the United States, and released a document entitled A Time To Choose Canada, the New Democrats' Trade Option with fellow MP Steven Langdon in February 1988. He also served as co-chairman of the NDP's international affairs committee, and held consultation meetings on whether or not the party should reaffirm its traditional opposition to Canadian membership in the North Atlantic Treaty Organization.

Blaikie considered running for the leadership of the New Democratic Party of Manitoba in 1988, following the surprise resignation of Howard Pawley. He eventually chose not to run, and did not endorse any other candidate. He was retained as the NDP's External Affairs Critic after the Progressive Conservatives won a second consecutive majority government in the 1988 federal election, and was also chosen as his party's spokesman for federal–provincial relations and the Constitution. He was an international observer during Namibia's transformation to independence in 1989, and for Lithuania's first multi-party elections in early 1990.

There were rumours that Blaikie would seek the federal New Democratic Party leadership after Ed Broadbent's resignation in 1989, but he declined to run and instead supported Simon de Jong, whom he described as having the greatest awareness of environmental issues. When de Jong was eliminated on the second ballot at a delegated convention, Blaikie moved to the camp of Audrey McLaughlin, the eventual winner.

Blaikie was appointed NDP Taxation Critic in 1990. He opposed the Mulroney government's decision to cut social programs to pay down the deficit, calling instead for a tightening of tax loopholes. He was given further responsibilities as Transport Critic, and spoke against proposed job cuts at Canadian National.

Chrétien government (1993–2003)

In parliament
Blaikie's closest election came in 1993, when the Liberal Party under Jean Chrétien defeated the Progressive Conservatives under new leader Kim Campbell to win a majority government. The New Democratic Party's support base had fallen in this period, due to unpopular decisions made by the provincial NDP governments of Bob Rae in Ontario and Michael Harcourt in British Columbia. Blaikie defeated Liberal candidate Art Miki by only 219 votes in Winnipeg—Transcona while his party fell from 44 to 9 seats nationally. Between 1993 and 1997, Blaikie was the only New Democratic Party MP to represent a riding east of Saskatchewan. He was appointed NDP Critic for Foreign Affairs and Trade after the election, and served another term as caucus chairman from 1993 to 1996.

In early 1994, Blaikie won unanimous support in the House of Commons for a Private Member's Bill calling for the government to officially recognize Canadians who served in the Dieppe Raid in World War II. He initially proposed that a special medal be struck, but later accepted a Liberal amendment for a "distinctive decoration". He was disappointed with the final result, a simple silver bar with ribbon attachment that was given to all service personnel from 1939 to 1943. Blaikie voted against the Chrétien government's gun registry in 1995, arguing that it did not address the real problems of gun-related violence.

There were again rumours that Blaikie would run for the NDP leadership in 1995, but he declined and gave his support to Lorne Nystrom. When Nystrom was eliminated at the party's convention, Blaikie shifted his support to the winner, Alexa McDonough.

The duties of NDP MPs were shuffled after the leadership convention. Blaikie was named as House Leader, while continuing as International Trade Critic and adding the Intergovernmental Affairs portfolio. He continued to hold these parliamentary roles after the 1997 election, in which the Liberals won a second majority government and the NDP made a partial recovery to 21 seats.

Blaikie was re-elected to a seventh term in 2000, as the Liberals won a third majority government under Chrétien. He retained his position as House Leader and Intergovernment Affairs Critic, and gained additional duties as critic for Parliamentary Reform, Justice and the Solicitor-General. He played a key role in getting the NDP Caucus to support the Clarity Act in 2000, after securing amendments that were important to First Nations groups in Quebec.

Ideological views
Blaikie emerged as a prominent critic of economic globalization during the mid-1990s. In 1996, he wrote that new rules governing the World Trade Organization would shift oversight of public policy from elected governments to unelected trade bureaucrats. He expressed similar concerns about the Multilateral Agreement on Investment (MAI) two years later, arguing that it put the rights of investors ahead of workers, environments, societies, and cultures. He wrote the NDP Minority Report on the MAI, which was published in Dismantling Democracy (edited by Andrew Jackson and Matthew Sanger).

Blaikie wrote a 1994 editorial calling for the Bank of Canada to hold a larger portion of the national debt at low interest rates, as it did until the mid-1970s, in order for Canada to reduce its deficit while maintaining its core social programs. In 1998, he led a national campaign against proposed mergers for Canada's major banks.

During the late 1990s and early 2000s, the New Democratic Party members were divided as to the party's position on the Canadian political spectrum. Some wanted to take the party into a more centrist direction, similar to Tony Blair's "Third Way" in Britain, while others sought to move in a radical left-wing direction. Blaikie was not closely affiliated with either camp. He opposed Blair's ideological approach on the grounds that it was too closely aligned with corporate interests. He participated in anti-globalization protests in Seattle and Quebec City but also criticized the extra-parliamentary left's tactics, saying that protests would never bring economic change without mobilization in the political sphere. He opposed the New Politics Initiative at the NDP's 2001 convention, calling instead for a renewal of the existing party organization.

Leadership campaign
Blaikie was the first declared candidate in the 2003 leadership election. He called for a renewed focus on health care, natural resources and labour standards. Blaikie was seen as a representative of the party's moderate left, fitting ideologically between the centrist Lorne Nystrom and the more left-wing Jack Layton. He was supported by MPs Pat Martin, Judy Wasylycia-Leis, Bev Desjarlais, Wendy Lill, Yvon Godin and Dick Proctor, Manitoba Premier Gary Doer, New Democratic Party of Ontario leader Howard Hampton, and several former MPs including Simon de Jong, Dawn Black, Ian Waddell and Howard McCurdy. In declaring his candidacy, he said,

The NDP's 2003 leadership convention was the first to be determined by a partial "one member, one vote" system in which all members of the NDP were eligible to cast ballots. Blaikie finished second to Jack Layton, who appointed him as Deputy Leader after the convention. As Layton did not have a seat in the Commons, Blaikie also served as the NDP's parliamentary leader until the 2004 federal election. This led to his being sworn in as a member of the Privy Council. He was also named as the NDP's National Defence Critic, and was front and centre in pushing the Liberals to not participate in the Iraq War, in opposing Canadian participation in ballistic missile defence, and in asking questions about the rules of engagement and changing role of Canadian troops in Afghanistan.

Martin government (2003–06)
Paul Martin succeeded Jean Chrétien as leader of the Liberal Party in November 2003 and as Prime Minister of Canada in December 2003, called a new election for June 2004. During this campaign, Blaikie openly disagreed with Layton's proposal that the Clarity Act be repealed. The Liberals were reduced to a minority government, and the NDP increased its representation from 14 to 19 seats. Blaikie continued as Deputy Leader and Defence Critic, and was also named as Health Critic. Notwithstanding their disagreement over the Clarity Act, Blaikie said that he enjoyed a good working relationship with Layton in parliament.

Harper government (2006–08)
The Conservative Party under Stephen Harper won a minority government in the 2006 federal election. Following the resumption of parliament in April, Blaikie was named as Deputy Speaker of the House of Commons. This position largely removed him from the day-to-day business of House debates, and put him in the role of a non-partisan overseer.

Parliamentary reform
Blaikie was an advocate for the reform of parliamentary institutions throughout his time in parliament. He served as second vice-chairman of an all-party committee on parliamentary reform in 1985, which among other things made it easier for private member's bills to come to a vote. He took part in another such committee in 1992, which issued a thirty-page report calling for more free votes, reforms to the parliamentary Question Period, and a streamlined process for passing legislation. He participated in a third such committee in 2001, although he indicated that he was disappointed with its results.

Retirement
On March 15, 2007, Blaikie announced that he would not be a candidate in the next federal election. He accepted a position as adjunct professor of Theology and Politics at the University of Winnipeg, and announced plans to write a book on the relationship between faith and politics. When he left the House of Commons in September 2008, he wrote an editorial that criticized parliament's declining standards, referring specifically to a rise in "character assassination, simulated indignation, and trivial pursuit over substantial debate".

Blaikie was a contributor to Northern Lights: An Anthology of Contemporary Christian Writing in Canada, which was published shortly after the 2008 federal election.

Provincial politics and later life
In December 2008, Blakie announced that he would seek the NDP nomination for the provincial division of Elmwood, which had been vacated by Jim Maloway, Blaikie's own successor in the federal riding of Elmwood-Transcona. He won the nomination unopposed, after two previously-declared candidates withdrew to support him. Both Blaikie and Maloway have rejected the suggestion that they planned to "swap" their federal and provincial seats, and Blaikie has said that he returned to political life on the request of Premier Gary Doer. He was elected without difficulty in late March 2009, and formally joined the legislature the following month. On November 3, 2009, Blaikie was appointed to the cabinet of Premier Greg Selinger as the Minister of Conservation and Government House Leader.

As Conservation Minister, Blaikie stewarded the development of five new provincial parks in Manitoba in 2011 and played a significant role in the government's attempts to protect the boreal forest on the east side of Lake Winnipeg.  A year later, he was conferred the Crocus Award from Nature Manitoba for his role in creating the five provincial parks.

On July 11, 2011, Blaikie announced that he would not be re-offering at the October 4 provincial election and would be retiring from political life.

Blaikie was appointed to the Order of Canada in November 2020 "for his lifelong contributions to parliamentary service and for his steadfast commitment to progressive change and social activism." Amid the COVID-19 pandemic in Canada, he was invested virtually on February 26, 2021.

Blaikie died from kidney cancer at his home in Winnipeg on September 24, 2022, at the age of 71.

His funeral was held on 2 October 2022 at a church in the Winnipeg suburb of Transcona, which was attended by family members, close friends, as well as Federal NDP Leader Jagmeet Singh, provincial NDP Leader Wab Kinew and former Manitoba premier Greg Selinger.

Other information
In 1988, Blaikie and House of Commons Speaker John Fraser organized the first annual Robbie Burns supper on Parliament Hill. Blaikie delivered the ritual address to the haggis, and played a few unscheduled tunes on the bagpipes.
In February 2001, parliamentarians were polled on the most effective member of the House of Commons of Canada. Blaikie tied for third place with Prime Minister Jean Chrétien.
On November 21, 2007, Blaikie was given the Maclean's award for Best Parliamentarian of the Year, as voted by his peers.
 Blaikie held the record as having the longest continuous parliamentary service of any CCF/NDP MP in Canadian history. 
Blaikie's daughter, Rebecca Blaikie, was the New Democratic Party candidate for LaSalle—Émard in the 2004 federal election. As executive director of the party's Quebec wing, she was one of the architects of Thomas Mulcair's historic victory in a 2007 Outremont by-election and was widely credited with setting the groundwork for the party's 2011 sweep of the province. She then returned to Manitoba to work for the provincial government and the non-profit Community Education Development Association. In the 2011 election, she ran in Winnipeg North, losing by 44 votes.
Blaikie's son Daniel Blaikie was elected the NDP member for Elmwood—Transcona in the October 2015 federal election, and was re-elected in the 2019 and 2021 federal elections.

Selected published works

Electoral record

Source:

Sources:

Sources:

Sources:

Sources:

Sources:

Sources:

Source:

Source:

Source:

All electoral information is taken from Elections Canada. Italicized expenditures from elections after 1997 refer to submitted totals, and are presented when the final reviewed totals are not available. Expenditures from 1997 refer to submitted totals. The +/- figures from 1988, 1997 and 2004 are adjusted for redistribution.

Footnotes

External links

1951 births
2022 deaths
20th-century Canadian politicians
21st-century Canadian politicians
Canadian Christian socialists
Canadian Methodist ministers
Canadian monarchists
Canadian people of Scottish descent
Deaths from cancer in Manitoba
Deaths from kidney cancer
Members of the Executive Council of Manitoba
Members of the House of Commons of Canada from Manitoba
Members of the King's Privy Council for Canada
Ministers of the United Church of Canada
New Democratic Party MPs
New Democratic Party of Manitoba MLAs
Officers of the Order of Canada
Politicians from Winnipeg
University of Toronto alumni
University of Winnipeg alumni